The following are the highest-grossing Punjabi-language films, as of December 2022.

Global gross figures

The Legend of Maula Jatt (2022) is the highest-grossing Punjabi-language film of all time from Pakistan (in Pakistan as well as in overseas). It has grossed over 10.6 million worldwide with 4.06 million coming from Pakistan and 6.52 million coming from overseas. 

Major markets for Pakistani Punjabi films are Pakistan, United Kingdom, United States, Canada, UAE, Saudi Arabia, and Australia with United Kingdom being the biggest overseas market.
 	
Carry on Jatta 2 (2018) is the highest-grossing Punjabi film of all time from India since June 2018. Worldwide collections of the film are 57.67 crore (8.43 million) with ₹41.59 crore (6.08 million) coming from India and ₹16.08 crore (2.35 million) coming from overseas. Also, the film is the highest-grossing Indian Punjabi film in India while in overseas the highest-grossing Indian Punjabi film is Chal Mera Putt 2 (2020) which has grossed more than 4.96 million (₹37.31 Crore). 

Major markets for Indian Punjabi films are India, Canada, United Kingdom, Australia, United States, and New Zealand with Canada being the biggest overseas market.

In this chart, films are ranked by the revenues from theatrical exhibition at their nominal value, along with the highest positions they attained. Thirty films in total have grossed in excess of ₹20 crore worldwide, out of which sixteen have grossed over ₹30 crore, seven have grossed over ₹45 crore, six have grossed over ₹50 crore, four have grossed over ₹57 crore and one has grossed over ₹85 crore, with The Legend of Maula Jatt and Carry on Jatta 2 ranked at the top positions respectively for Pakistani Punjabi and Indian Punjabi films.

Highest-grossing films adjusted for inflation

Highest-grossing films by country

India

Canada

United Kingdom and Ireland

Highest-grossing films overseas

Highest-grossing films by year

Highest-grossing Panjabi franchises and film series

Notes and references 

Cinema of Punjab
Lists of Punjabi films